Vasireddy Venkatadri Nayudu was a hereditary zamindar of Chintapalli, later Amaravathi, in the Guntur district of India, under the Nizam of Hyderabad and the British East India Company. He had under his control 552 villages and towns located in Guntur and Krishna districts and their environs. Peeved by the perceived mistreatment by the East India Company, he abandoned his hereditary palace at Chintapalli and built a new palace and town at Amaravathi, the site of the ancient Satavahana capital. In the process of its construction, his workers unearthed the famous Amaravati Stupa as well as causing considerable damage to it.

Family
The Vasireddy zamindari family might have been founded by Vasireddy Verappanaidu, who obtained appointment as a Deshmukh of the Nandigama pargana in 1670 under the Golkonda Sultanate. Shortly afterwards, Golkonda became part of the Mughal Empire, but his estate was apparently continued. After his death, the estate got divided among his three sons, Ramanna, Jagganna and Venkatadrinaidu, with Jagganna receiving the estate of Chintapalli in the Guntur district.

Vasireddy Venkatadri Nayudu was born on 27 April 1761 to Jagganna (Jagga Bhupathi) and his wife Acchamamba. According to journalist Potturi Venkateswara Rao, Jagganna fought against the Nizam and died when Venkatadri Naidu was at very small age. After the death of Jagga Bhupathi his wife Acchamamba committed Sati.

Venkatadri Nayudu, then four year old, was brought up by his uncle Ramanna. After the death of Ramanna, it would appear that Nayudu inherited the estates of both his father and his uncle.

Meanwhile, the power balance in South India was in a flux. The five coastal districts that came to be known as Northern Circars became the key ground for Anglo-French rivalry. The fourth Nizam, Salabat Jang, ceded control over them to the French East India Company in return for their help in his accession.  The French control however ended with the British conquest of Masulipatnam in 1759. The British East India Company received the grant of the Circars from the Mughal emperor Shah Alam II in 1765, confirmed by the Nizam in 1768. The Guntur district, excluded in the initial grant, was also ceded in 1788. The British were now the overlords of the Vasireddy family.

Rule
Vasireddy Venkatadri Naidu was crowned Zamindar in the year 1783, when the Guntur district was under the control of Nizam with British assistance. He ruled until 1816.  The original seat of power was Chintapalli in the present-day Guntur district. Later Naidu shifted his capital to Dharanikota across the Krishna river in Guntur district, before constructing a new capital at neighbouring Amaravathi. He was a patron of the arts and literature, and a builder of numerous temples in the Krishna river delta. He renovated the ancient temples at Amaravathi, Chebrolu, Mangalagiri, and Ponnuru.

Venkatadri successfully eliminated Pindaris who were robbing the people in Guntur region. During his reign, Chenchus (forest tribe) were raiding villages around Amaravathi. Venkatadri invited about 600 of the Chenchu men to a luncheon and ordered them to be killed. The villages where this incident took place is today called Narukulapadu ('Naruku' in Telugu language means 'to axe' or 'to chop'). After this incident the Rajah became repentant and came to Amaravathi and devoted his entire life, time and revenues to building temples to Lord Siva. He renovated the Amareswaraswamy temple here, got nine learned archakas to be brought for the daily archana of the Lord, and provided them with all the needs of livelihood, including  of land to each. The temple as it stands now owes much to him.

Venkatadri was assisted by a very able minister and poet Mulugu Papayaradhya. There were several poets and scholars in the court of Venkatadri.

Gallery of fort in Amaravathi

Notes

Bibliography

Further reading
 Demand rises for opening royal castles in Andhra, Hans India, 23 August 2016.
 
 Raja Vasireddy Venkatadri Naidu'', by Kodali Lakshmi Narayana

People from Guntur district
Telugu monarchs
People from Krishna district
1761 births

'':1816 
18th-century Indian monarchs
19th-century Indian monarchs